Carlos Alberto Matos Rodrigues (born 14 March 1996), commonly known as Cal, is a Brazilian footballer who currently plays as a midfielder for Enosis.

Career statistics

Club

Notes

References

1996 births
Living people
Brazilian footballers
Brazilian expatriate footballers
Association football midfielders
Campeonato Brasileiro Série B players
Cypriot First Division players
Clube Náutico Capibaribe players
Ferroviário Atlético Clube (CE) players
Enosis Neon Paralimni FC players
Brazilian expatriate sportspeople in Cyprus
Expatriate footballers in Cyprus
Sportspeople from Recife